The Hot Springs team was a minor league baseball team based in Hot Springs, South Dakota in 1891 and 1892. The Hot Springs team was without a known moniker and played two seasons as members of the Independent level Black Hills League.

History
In 1891, the Hot Springs team became charter members when the Black Hills League began minor league play as a four–team Independent league, with franchises based in both Nebraska and South Dakota. The other 1891 Black Hills League charter franchises were the teams from Chadron, Nebraska, Deadwood, South Dakota (Deadwood Metropolitans) and Lead City Grays. The 1891 team records and Black Hills League standings are unknown.

The Hot Springs team continued play as same four teams returned to play in the 1892 season. The 1892 season was the final season for the minor league Black Hills League. The 1892 league remained an Independent League and the circuit permanently folded following the 1892 season. Hot Springs and the other host cities have not hosted minor league baseball since the Black Hills League folded. Lew Camp played for Hot Springs in 1892.

The overall team records, standings and statistics from the 1891 and 1892 Black Hills League seasons are unknown.

The ballpark
The exact name and location of the Hot Springs home ballpark in Hot Springs, South Dakota is unknown.

Timeline

Year-by-year standings
The team records and standings from the 1891 and 1892 Black Hill League seasons are unknown.

Notable alumni
Lew Camp (1892)

References

External links
 Baseball Reference

Defunct baseball teams in South Dakota
Professional baseball teams in South Dakota
Baseball teams established in 1891
Baseball teams disestablished in 1892
Black Hills League teams
Fall River County, South Dakota